Saline Township is located in Madison County, Illinois, in the United States. As of the 2010 census, its population was 6,321 and it contained 2,486 housing units. Saline Township covers the northern part of Highland, most of Grantfork, and the Madison County portion of Pierron. The government offices are in Woodcrest Drive in Highland.

History
Saline Township was named from the salinity of a salt well.

Geography

Demographics

References

External links
City-data.com
Illinois State Archives

Townships in Madison County, Illinois
Townships in Illinois